Mecyclothorax eipomeki is a species of ground beetle in the subfamily Psydrinae. It was described by Baehr in 1995.

References

eipomeki
Beetles described in 1995